The Stari Vlah-Raška Mountain Range (Старовлашко-Рашке планине, Старовлашко-Рашка висија) is a highland in southwest Serbia, in the regions of Stari Vlah and Raška, which part of the Dinaric Alps. These highlands stretch from Užice, Arilje and Ivanjica to the border with Montenegro.

Its major mountains include.

  Mokra Gora (Raška)
  Golija (Raška)
  Hum (Raška)
  Jadovnik (Stari Vlah)
  Ozren (Stari Vlah)
  Zvijezda (Stari Vlah)
  Radočelo (Raška)
  Zlatar (Stari Vlah)
  Giljeva (Stari Vlah)
  Žilindar (Raška)
  Čemerno (Raška)
  Tara (Stari Vlah)
  Mučanj (Stari Vlah)
  Javor (Stari Vlah)
  Kamena Gora (Stari Vlah)
  Zlatibor (Stari Vlah)
  Čemernica (Stari Vlah)
  Pešter (Raška)
  Javorje (Stari Vlah)
  Murtenica (Stari Vlah)
  Rogozna (Raška)
  Ninaja (Raška)
  Gradina (Stari Vlah)
  Jarut (Raška)
  Pobijenik (Stari Vlah)
  Jabuka (Stari Vlah)
  Bić (Stari Vlah)
  Kukutnica (Stari Vlah)
  Bitovik (Stari Vlah)
  Oštrik (Stari Vlah)
  Banjsko brdo (Stari Vlah)
  Gajeva planina (Stari Vlah)
  Projić (Stari Vlah)
  Crni Vrh (Stari Vlah)

See also
Mountains of Serbia

References

Mountain ranges of Serbia
Dinaric Alps
Mountain ranges of Europe